Academic careerism is the tendency of academics (professors specifically and intellectuals generally) to pursue their own enrichment and self-advancement at the expense of honest inquiry, unbiased research and dissemination of truth to their students and society. Such careerism has been criticized by thinkers from Socrates in ancient Athens to Russell Jacoby in the present.

Socrates' criticism of the Sophists 

In Xenophon's Memorabilia, Socrates draws a comparison between the proper and honorable way to bestow beauty and the proper and honorable way to bestow wisdom. Those who offer beauty for sale on the market are called prostitutes, and are held in disrepute by the Athenians. Those who offer wisdom for sale, on the other hand, are highly respected. Socrates believes this is an error. The Sophists should be seen for what they are, prostitutors of wisdom.

In Plato's Protagoras, Socrates draws an analogy between peddlers of unhealthy food and peddlers of false and deceptive wisdom. Food peddlers advertise their wares as healthy without offering solid evidence to back up their claims, leading those who trust them to succumb to an unhealthy diet. Peddlers of knowledge try to persuade impressionable young minds that what they teach is salutary and true, again without offering solid arguments to back up their claims. They mislead young minds on paths not conducive to intellectual flourishing.

Schopenhauer's criticism of university philosophy 

Nineteenth-century German philosopher Arthur Schopenhauer contrasts the genuine philosopher, who earnestly pursues truth and offers its fruits to all who will listen, to the "businessmen of the chair", the academics of his day who have debased the pursuit of knowledge into a means of livelihood no more dignified than the practice of business or law. The motto of the academic opportunists is "primum vivere deinde philosophari"—first live, afterwards philosophize. The bourgeois sentiment that someone who earns his living by a profession must know something about it makes those who hold the academic chairs immune from criticism. They make their living from philosophy, the public reasons, so they must know philosophy. The philosophy taught in the universities, Schopenhauer claims, is really no more than a superficial rationalization for the institutionalized religion, the intentions of the government, and the prevailing views of the times.

Julien Benda's Treason of the Intellectuals 
French scholar Julien Benda (1867–1956) observes that in the past intellectuals have adopted two poses toward politics. The first was Plato's doctrine that morality must decide politics. The second was Machiavelli's, which said that politics has nothing to do with morality. Benda accuses the generation of intellectuals influential in France in the 1920s of adopting a third, far more pernicious, pose: that politics must be allowed to decide morality. The cause of this "divinizing of politics" is that the intellectuals (French clercs) of his era have abandoned the ideal of disinterestedness, and now consider themselves to be ordinary citizens, subject to the same incentives as ordinary citizens.

The pursuit of personal advantage by purveying knowledge, Benda explains, has been held in disrepute since antiquity. But in his generation, this view of intellectual work has begun to seem obsolete, replaced by a kind of institutionalized careerism in which intellectuals were driven by the same petty desires for personal advantage as businessmen and lawyers.

Albert Einstein’s criticism of an academic career
Einstein (1879 –1955)  was a civil servant working in the Berne Swiss patent office (1902 – 1909). In 1905, a year sometimes described as his 'miracle year', Einstein published four groundbreaking papers. These outlined the theory of the photoelectric effect, explained Brownian motion, introduced special relativity, and demonstrated mass-energy equivalence. On his seventieth birthday Einstein wrote that in retrospect the formulation of patent statements had been a blessing.  “It gave me the opportunity to think about physics.  Moreover a practical profession is a salvation for a man of my type: an academic career compels a young man to scientific production and only strong characters can resist the temptation of superficial analysis.”

Russell Jacoby's criticisms of contemporary academia 
Historian Russell Jacoby, writing in the 1970s, observes that intellectual production has succumbed to the same pattern of planned obsolescence used by manufacturing enterprises to generate renewed demand for their products.

Jacoby laments the demise of the radical critical theory of the previous generation, which sought to understand and articulate the contradictions inherent in bourgeois and liberal democratic ideologies. The new generation of theories, in contrast, seek to allow the contradictory elements of the ideology to coexist by isolating them, assigning them to separate departments in the university. This division of intellectual labor in the service of the prevailing ideology, Jacoby says, "severs the life nerve of dialectical thought."

Jacoby ends his 1987 book The Last Intellectuals on a despairing note, observing that even radical Marxist intellectuals aren't immune to the pressure to achieve tenure, and have begun to alter their research methods in conformity to pressure from university administrators.

Edward Said's description of the career of critical theory in the 1980s 

Literature professor Edward Said, in his 1983 book The World, the Text, and the Critic, accuses literary theorists of his generation of succumbing to the free-market ideology of the Reagan era. The previous generation of critical theorists, Said explains, did not allow itself to be constrained by the conventional separation of academic fiefdoms. It maintained an insurrectionary relationship with the society in which it lived. The generation of critical theorists influential in the 1980s, however, began to betray these ideals, and timorously succumbed to the prevailing societal ethic of specialization and professionalism.

Camille Paglia's characterization of the "junk bond" era in academia 

Writing in 1991, "dissident feminist" scholar Camille Paglia finds in David Halperin's work a prototypical example of rampant careerism in the humanities. Paglia observes that Halperin's generation of academics is prone to a "contemporary parochialism" that eagerly cites hot-off-the-press articles without attempting to critically assess their objective merit in light of the intellectual tradition. Paglia accuses Halperin of assembling a pastiche of the latest faddish opinions and marketing it as a book, not for the sake of advancing the cause of truth, but with no other aim than career advancement. She compares such scholarship to junk bonds, a highly volatile investment.  

Paglia characterizes contemporary academic discourse, influenced by French theorists such as Jacques Lacan, Jacques Derrida, and Michel Foucault, as the academic equivalent of name brand consumerism. "Lacan, Derrida, and Foucault," she says, "are the academic equivalents of BMW, Rolex, and Cuisinart." Under the inspiration of the latest academic fashions, academics manufacture insipid prose with no objective merit for the same reason fashion designers come out with new fashions each season. Academics peddle the latest fashionable theories to replace perfectly good older theories, made obsolete not by genuine progress, but only by incessant changes in fashion, changes deliberately contrived to create consumer demand in a credulous public. The self-seeking of the latest generation of scholars is, for Paglia, symptomatic of an era iconically represented by junk bond traders on Wall Street, concerned not with creating a quality product, but only with making a quick buck. She takes Halperin's essay "Why is Diatoma a Woman?" as an example, calling it "one of the great junk bonds of the fast-track academic era, whose unbridled greed for fame and power was intimately in sync with parallel developments on Wall Street".

As a remedy for rampant careerism in academia, Paglia prescribes a return to the ancient ascetic roots of the academic tradition.

Paglia advises the graduate students of the next generation to return to the gentlemanly and ascetic traditions of past academics, avoiding faddish subjects or methods of interpretation, refusing to seek material reward from their work, and pursuing instead a lofty ideal of scholarship in which work follows "its own organic rhythm" rather than chasing the latest trends to win approval from contemporaries.

See also 

 Extreme careerism
 Forced ranking
 Least publishable unit
 Metascience
 Perverse incentive
 Publish or perish
 Sociology of science

References

Further reading 

 
 
 

Academia
Career development